John W. Schultz (born 26 February 1959) is a former Australian rules footballer who played with St Kilda in the Victorian Football League (VFL).

Schultz was defender, who came to St Kilda after winning a Henderson Medal in 1983, while with Ballarat Football League club Daylesford. The 25-year-old played games against Hawthorn, Geelong and Carlton in the 1984 VFL season.

References

1959 births
Australian rules footballers from Victoria (Australia)
St Kilda Football Club players
Daylesford Football Club players
Living people